John Ronane (11 December 1933 – 15 May 2019) was a British actor.

He appeared onstage in the West End, in movies in Hollywood and Europe, on television and radio. As a member of the Royal Shakespeare Company, he appeared in the original production of Harold Pinter's The Collection at the Aldwych Theatre in 1962.

His films include King Rat (1965), Charlie Bubbles (1967), Some May Live (1967), Sebastian (1968), Nobody Ordered Love (1972), and the 1975 remake of The Spiral Staircase.

On TV, he starred in the Emmy-nominated A War of Children for CBS. In the UK, he was a regular character in Granada TV's Strangers between 1978 and 1982, in which he played Detective Sgt Singer. He appeared in the television mini-series The Six Wives of Henry VIII and Elizabeth R as Thomas Seymour. Ronane's other TV credits include: Z-Cars, Dixon of Dock Green, The Saint, The Avengers, Department S, Two in Clover, Strange Report, The Persuaders!, Out of the Unknown, Survivors, starred in 'Trust Red' in The Sweeney, 1990, All Creatures Great and Small, Only When I Laugh, Juliet Bravo, Howards' Way and Press Gang.

He had other starring roles in the 1960s in ATV's Drama 61-67, in "The Hooded Terror", "The Taxi's For Johnny," and "Two Love Stories."

He also appeared onstage at the Apollo Theatre, Peoria, Illinois as Marc in Art, fulfilling a show biz desire to "play in Peoria".

He taught drama and acting at the University of Illinois at Urbana–Champaign and Illinois Central College.

He was married to Carole, and he had four children.

He wrote, directed and starred in the play Words and Pictures, and wrote two novels: Hank Goes Dancing (a 1950s romp through British national service) and the action-romantic thriller Gone for a Soldier. Additionally, he wrote several screenplays. His memoir Rubber-Soled Shoes was published in 2017 by Versa Press.

Filmography

References

External links
 

1933 births
2019 deaths
British male television actors
20th-century British male actors
21st-century British male actors
University of Illinois Urbana-Champaign faculty